Evgeny Petrovich Karnovich (15 November 1823 – 6 November 1885) was Russian writer, historian, journalist and editor.

Born in rural Yaroslavl region into an affluent Ukrainian landlord's family, Karnovich started his literary career in the 1840s as a translator of Aristophanes' comedies and a poet, while working as a teacher, then a minor state official. Several years later he moved to Vilno, to become the head of the local Archeologist committee. In 1859, after retirement, Karnovich became a professional journalist, writing on the subjects of history, politics, social issues and jurisprudence, as well as publishing his own poems and stories.

In 1858–1861 he was the head of the Contemporary Review section Sovremennik, in 1865–1871, one of the leading figures in the Golos newspaper staff. He published the weekly magazine Mirovoi Posrednik (People's Attorney, 1861–1862), edited Birzhevyie Vedomosti (Stock Exchange News, 1875–1876) and Otgoloski (Echoes, 1881–1882). In his later years Karnovich, now a respected historian, published numerous essays (in Istorichesky Vestnik, Nedelya, Russkaya Mysl, Narodnaya Shkola and Nov) as well as several historical novels on the 17th–18th century Russian history.

References

External links
The Evgeny Karnovich page at Lib.ru

1823 births
1885 deaths
People from Yaroslavsky Uyezd
Russian editors
19th-century writers from the Russian Empire
19th-century historians from the Russian Empire
Burials at Nikolskoe Cemetery